Long Jia (born 29 August 1998) is a Chinese freestyle wrestler. She won the silver medal in the 65kg event at the 2022 World Wrestling Championships held in Belgrade, Serbia.

In 2021, she competed at the Asian Olympic Qualification Tournament and qualified for the 2020 Summer Olympics in Tokyo, Japan. She thus represented China at the 2020 Summer Olympics in the 62 kg event.

References

External links 
 

1998 births
Living people
Place of birth missing (living people)
Chinese female sport wrestlers
Olympic wrestlers of China
Wrestlers at the 2020 Summer Olympics
World Wrestling Championships medalists
21st-century Chinese women